Lee Jun-Ki (born April 25, 1982) is a professional footballer from South Korea. He currently plays for Phuket City in the Thai League 3.

Honours

Club
Jeonnam Dragons
 Korean FA Cup winners (2) : 2006, 2007

External links
 

1982 births
Living people
South Korean footballers
Association football defenders
FC Seoul players
Korean Police FC (Semi-professional) players
Jeonnam Dragons players
Lee Jun-ki
Lee Jun-ki
K League 1 players
South Korean expatriate footballers
Lee Jun-ki
Lee Jun-ki
South Korean expatriate sportspeople in Thailand
Expatriate footballers in Thailand
Lee Jun-ki